Reykjavik Art Museum (founded in 1973) is the largest visual art institution in Iceland. It occupies three locations in Reykjavík; Hafnarhús by the old harbour  Kjarvalsstaðir by Klambratún  and Ásmundarsafn in Laugardalur 

The Museum possesses the largest art collection in Iceland and the most voluminous gallery space to be found amongst the country's galleries. In more than 3000 square meters of gallery space over twenty exhibitions are run every year, ranging from extensive exhibitions from the museum's collection to installations of contemporary art by young, international artists.

The Museum offers a variety of events all year round where art is closely examined from different angles and with different emphasis. Extensive family programmes as well as guided tours for students of all levels are cultivated. In addition, the museum takes active part in ambitious cooperative projects and festivals in the field of music, film, design, dance, drama and literature.

The Museum is in charge of the city's art collection while Reykjavik city is responsible for the management and financing of the museum. Reykjavik Art Museum consists of five separate art properties: a general art collection of Reykjavik city (including outdoor works in Reykjavik), an Erró collection, a Kjarval collection, the Ásmundur Sveinsson Sculpture Museum and a collection of the architecture department.

Artwork from the museum is also on display in public buildings and in open areas throughout the city.

Hafnarhús
Hafnarhús is the most recent addition to the locations of Reykjavik Art Museum and was occupied after a complete renovation in April 2000. The building had its former function as the harbour's warehouse and during its renovation, care was taken to preserve as much as possible of the building's original architecture.

The museum comprises six galleries, the courtyard and a multi-purpose room where ongoing events of a wide variety take place, ranging from rock concerts to poetry reading. Hafnarhús exhibits works from the Erró collection at all times. The Icelandic pop-artist Erró (1932) who has lived and worked in Paris for decades has donated a tremendous collection of his invaluable works and is still adding to the collection.

Kjarvalsstaðir
Kjarvalsstaðir (opened 1973) is named after one of the most beloved painters of the nation, Jóhannes S. Kjarval (1885–1972). His works form a large part of the collection of Reykjavik Art Museum and can be found there at all times. Kjarval was a living legend, a romantic bohem who captured the beauty and mystique of the land which he so intimately knew. The unique building of Kjarvalsstaðir is surrounded by garden of Klambratún and is located a short distance from downtown Reykjavík. The building is the first of its kind in Iceland to be specifically designed for visual art exhibitions. In addition to exhibitions of Kjarval's works, temporary exhibitions of Icelandic and international art are featured as well as architecture and design with emphasis on works of the twentieth century.

Ásmundarsafn
Ásmundarsafn (opened 1983) is dedicated to the sculptures and drawings of Ásmundur Sveinsson (1893–1982). The works to be seen there span Ásmundur's entire career and they are featured thematically as well as collectively with works of other artists. Ásmundur was one of Iceland's pioneers in the art of sculpture and his works are located both outdoors and indoors throughout the country.

Ásmundur's sculptures are exhibited inside as well as outside the museum, which is the artist's former home and studio. Ásmundur designed and built the house mostly by himself in the years 1942 to 1950. In the architecture he plays with a theme from the Arab culture along with a Mediterranean influence. A sculpture garden surrounding the museum with works by the artist stays open to the public all year round.

References

External links

Reykjavik Art Museum website

Art museums established in 1973
Art museums and galleries in Iceland
Museums in Reykjavík
1973 establishments in Iceland